William Martin (19 February 1844 – 27 May 1871) was an English first-class cricketer. Martin was a right-handed batsman who bowled right-arm medium pace.

Martin represented Hampshire in one first-class match in 1867 against Kent at the Antelope Ground.

Martin died in Southampton, Hampshire on 27 May 1871, aged just 27.

External links
William Martin at Cricinfo
William Martin at CricketArchive

1844 births
1871 deaths
Cricketers from Southampton
English cricketers
Hampshire cricketers